The 2023 Nova Scotia Tankard, the provincial men's curling championship for Nova Scotia, was held from January 25 to 30 at the Bluenose Curling Club in New Glasgow, Nova Scotia. The event was held in conjunction with the 2023 Nova Scotia Scotties Tournament of Hearts, the women's provincial championship. 

The winning Matthew Manuel rink represented Nova Scotia at the 2023 Tim Hortons Brier in London, Ontario where they finished sixth in Pool A with a 3–5 record.

This was the first time the event has been held since 2020 due to the COVID-19 pandemic.

Unlike previous tournaments, there was no preliminary round to qualify for the provincial championship. Any team was able to register to compete in the championship.

Teams
The teams are listed as follows:

Knockout brackets

Source:

A event

B event

C event

Knockout results
All draw times listed in Atlantic Time (UTC−04:00).

Draw 1
Wednesday, January 25, 12:00 pm

Draw 2
Wednesday, January 25, 4:00 pm

Draw 3
Wednesday, January 25, 8:00 pm

Draw 4
Thursday, January 26, 12:00 pm

Draw 5
Thursday, January 26, 8:00 pm

Draw 6
Friday, January 27, 12:00 pm

Draw 7
Friday, January 27, 4:00 pm

Draw 8
Friday, January 27, 8:00 pm

Draw 9
Saturday, January 28, 12:00 pm

Draw 10
Saturday, January 28, 8:00 pm

Draw 11
Sunday, January 29, 9:00 am

Draw 12
Sunday, January 29, 2:00 pm

Playoffs
Source:

Semifinal
Sunday, January 29, 7:00 pm

Final
Monday, January 30, 9:30 am

References

2023 in Nova Scotia
Curling in Nova Scotia
2023 Tim Hortons Brier
January 2023 sports events in Canada
New Glasgow, Nova Scotia